Pietermaritzburg City Hall is a historic city hall located at Pietermaritzburg in KwaZulu-Natal, South Africa.

History 
The building was erected between 1899 and 1901. It replaced a previous town hall, built in 1893 and subsequently destroyed by a fire in 1898. The new building was officially inaugurated in August 1901 by His Royal Highness the Duke of Cornwall.

Description 
The buildings features a Flemish Renaissance Revival style and red brick façades. It comprises a 47 metre tall corner campanile.

Gallery

See also 
 List of heritage sites in Pietermaritzburg

References

External links
 
 

Pietermaritzburg
Buildings and structures in Pietermaritzburg